Lady Jennifer is a 1908 novel by the British writer John Strange Winter. It was adapted into a 1915 British silent film of the same title starring Harry Royston.

References

Bibliography
 Goble, Alan. The Complete Index to Literary Sources in Film. Walter de Gruyter, 1999.

1908 British novels
Novels set in England
Novels by John Strange Winter
British novels adapted into films